Patricia Ann Regan (born December 13, 1972) is a conservative American television talk show host and author. She hosted Trish Regan Primetime on the Fox Business Network from 2015 to 2020.

Regan was previously a television host on Bloomberg Television from 2012 to 2015, and a host at CNBC from 2007 to 2012. She was also a contributor on Fox Business and Fox News.

Early life and education
She was Miss New Hampshire and represented her home state in the Miss America 1994 pageant. Regan went on to study voice in Graz, Austria, and at the New England Conservatory of Music in Boston before enrolling at Columbia University. She attended and graduated from Phillips Exeter Academy in Exeter, New Hampshire, graduating in 1991. She graduated from Columbia with a B.A. in history in 2000.

Career

CBS (2001–07) 
Regan got her start in 2001 at CBS MarketWatch, then owned partially by CBS News, where she was a business correspondent reporting for the CBS Evening News through 2007. She also contributed to Face the Nation and 48 Hours. Her work on the terror connection between the Tri-Border region of South America and Islamic terrorist groups earned her an Emmy nomination for Investigative Reporting in 2007.

While working at CBS News, Regan was a correspondent for CBS MoneyWatch. In 2002, she earned the Most Outstanding Young Broadcast Journalist Award from the Northern California Society of Professional Journalists for her work there.

CNBC (2007–12) 
During her tenure at CNBC, Regan hosted a daily markets show and created documentary long-form programming for the network.

Regan was nominated for a Best Documentary Emmy Award while also earning a Gerald Loeb nomination for her documentary work on "Against the Tide: The Battle for New Orleans" – an investigative piece on the New Orleans levee system, after Hurricane Katrina.

Bloomberg Television (2012–15) 
Prior to joining Fox, Regan was an anchor at Bloomberg Television where she hosted the daily global market show, "Street Smart with Trish Regan."

Fox Business and Fox News (2015–2020) 
Regan joined Fox News and Fox Business in 2015, serving as anchor for The Intelligence Report with Trish Regan weekdays. She switched to a traditional conservative talk format for a new primetime show in 2018, titled Trish Regan Primetime.

Denmark comments 
In August 2018, Regan likened Denmark to Venezuela. Regan said Denmark's economic model was unfeasible and argued that "there's something rotten in Denmark". During the segment, Regan sought to demonstrate that the economic model in Denmark was unfeasible. She made a number of misleading claims about Denmark, including: "everyone in Denmark is working for the government" and "no-one wants to work". The segment stirred controversy in both Denmark and the U.S., with news outlets, politicians, experts, and the Danish government noting that, relative to the United States, Denmark is ranked higher on indicators of economic freedom, ease-of-doing-business, happiness, and has higher employment figures. Regan's figures about Danish unemployment were only correct if she included unemployed babies, children, and retired people; Denmark's unemployment rate was actually lower than that of the U.S. Danish Social Democrat politician Dan Jørgensen ridiculed and criticized Regan's remarks, calling them "untrue." Regan also said "nobody graduates from school" because the government "pays" students to go to school; according to The Washington Post, while direct comparisons are difficult, fewer than 60% of US college students finish in six years, whereas in Denmark 79% of undergraduates finish their coursework. The paper noted that this includes American students who can't afford college in the United States.

After her remarks were criticized in the US and Danish press, Regan attempted to clarify her remarks, saying: "Just to be clear, I was never implying that conditions in Denmark were similar in any way to the current tragedy on the ground there in Venezuela". She added, "I was merely pointing out, using reports from The Atlantic, The Independent, and other publications, that socialism is not the way." These sources have since rebutted her claim, stating that "Our articles do not show that socialism does not definitively work".

Coronavirus 

On March 9, 2020, amid a coronavirus outbreak, Regan said Democrats had exploited the crisis for political gain as Fox Business ran a chyron saying "Coronavirus Impeachment Scam." Regan said, "The chorus of hate being leveled at the President is nearing a crescendo as Democrats blame him, and only him, for a virus that originated halfway around the world. This is yet another attempt to impeach the president, and sadly it seems they care very little for any of the destruction they are leaving in their wake." Shortly thereafter, Fox Business put her show on hiatus after the March 12 broadcast, and on March 27, it was reported that Fox Business had parted ways with her.

References

External links
 CNBC Biography
 

Living people
21st-century American journalists
American beauty pageant winners
American expatriates in Austria
American television news anchors
Bloomberg L.P. people
CNBC people
Columbia College (New York) alumni
Miss America 1994 delegates
American women television journalists
Fox Business people
Fox News people
Phillips Exeter Academy alumni
1972 births
21st-century American women